For over one thousand years the Zhuang have used Sawndip to write a wide variety of literature, including folk songs, operas, poems, scriptures, letters, contracts, and court documents. The works include both entirely indigenous works and translations from Chinese, fact and fiction, religious and secular and give us insight in to the life of the Zhuang and the people they have had contact with over a period of two millennia, a writing tradition that is still alive to this day.

Characteristics

Sawndip literature is traditionally though not always written in verse. Only a small percentage of Sawndip literature has been published. Folk songs, or stories, are often adapted over time. For example, Fwen Ciengzyeingz, meaning "Song to tell others", gives a philosophy of life, and of which Liáng Tíngwàng (梁庭望) observes from the proper pronouns used, the song has its origin in the Sui-Tang Dynasties and with its final form was set almost a thousand years later in the latter part of the Ming Dynasty.

Whilst the rules are flexible the two main types of verse are either 5 characters a line or 7 characters a line, and commonly 4 lines to a stanza. In some texts whilst lines are resung several times in set combinations, the lines are only written once. Waist rhyming is common. Older manuscripts for antiphonal songs only record the male lyrics, whereas modern versions may include both male and female lyrics.

Notable Works

The Orphan Girl and the Rich Girl (Cinderella)
One fairy tale which has attracted much attention in recent years is "The orphan girl and the rich girl" an early version of the story Cinderella (Zhuang "Dahgyax Dahbengz" Dah - indicates female, gyax means orphan and bengz means rich) found in Zhuang opera scripts. A 9th century Chinese translation of the Zhuang story entitled Ye Xian was written in the Miscellaneous Morsels from Youyang and the Sawndip versions we now have are quite similar and analysis suggests these versions took shape no later than the 10th century.

Song about Tang Emperors
"Song about Tang Emperors" ("𠯘唐皇" Fwen Dangzvuengz), is about 5,000 lines long, and mainly about Li Dan the fifth and ninth emperor of Tang Dynasty born in 662，the content is similar to sections of the 18th century Chinese historical novel 《薛刚反唐》 hence some consider it to be an adaptation from the novel, however some manuscript evidence suggests it was already in circulation in the 17th century.

"The house-building song"
"The house-building song" has been sung for over a thousand years. This song has two parts. The first part describes the construction of a traditional stilt house and the second part the customs to ward off evil from the new home.

"The Origin of the Bronze Drum"
"The Origin of the Bronze Drum" tells of the origins of bronze drums that are like "stars" (such drums have a star in the middle of them), that they are as many as the stars of the sky and like stars can ward off evil spirits.

References

History of literature